The black-faced ibis (Theristicus melanopis) is a species of bird in the family Threskiornithidae. It is found in grassland and fields in southern and western South America. It has been included as a subspecies of the similar buff-necked ibis, but today all major authorities accept the split. The black-faced ibis also includes the Andean ibis (T. branickii) as a subspecies.  Some taxonomic authorities (including the American Ornithological Society) still do so.

Taxonomy
The black-faced ibis was formally described in 1789 by the German naturalist Johann Friedrich Gmelin in his revised and expanded edition of Carl Linnaeus's Systema Naturae. He placed it in the genus Tantalus and coined the binomial name Tantalus melanopsis. Gmelin based his description on the "black-faced ibis" that had been described and illustrated in 1785 by the  English ornithologist John Lathamin his book A General Synopsis of Birds. Latham had based his account on a specimen in the Leverian Museum and on drawings in the collection of the naturalist Joseph Banks. Georg Forster mentioned seeing these birds in January 1775 on "New Year's Island" (now Isla Observatorio) near Staten Island in his account of James Cook's second yoyage to the Pacific. The black-faced ibis is now one of four South American ibises placed in the genus Theristicus that was introduced by the German naturalist Johann Georg Wagler in 1832. The genus name is from the Ancient Greek theristikos meaning "of reaping". The specific epithet melanopis combines the Greek melas meaning "black" with -ōpis meaning "faced". The species is monotypic: no subspecies are recognised.

Description
The head, neck and lower chest are buffish, the crown and nape are cinnamon, the upperparts and (often incomplete) chest-band are grey, the belly and flight feathers are black, and the wing-coverts are whitish (though not contrasting strongly with the grey upperparts). The bill, throat-wattle and bare skin around the eyes are blackish and the legs are red.

The similar buff-necked ibis is almost entirely restricted to warm regions, has contrasting large white wing-patches, a dark grey (not buff) lower chest, and its throat-wattle is smaller than in the black-faced ibis.

Distribution and status
It also occurs very locally in coastal Peru. While it remains fairly common in Argentina and Chile, this species has now been almost entirely extirpated from the Peruvian part of its range.

Overall the species is not threatened, and consequently assigned Least Concern by the IUCN.

References

 Jaramillo, A., P. Burker, & D. Beadle (2003). Birds of Chile. Christopher Helm. 
 Matheu, E., & J. del Hoyo (1992). Family Threskiornithidae (Ibises and Spoonbills). pp. 472–506 in: del Hoyo, J., A. Elliott, & J. Sargatal (editors). Handbook of the Birds of the World. Vol. 1. Ostrich to Ducks. Lynx Edicions, Barcelona. 

black-faced ibis
Birds of Peru
Birds of Chile
Birds of Patagonia
black-faced ibis
black-faced ibis
Taxonomy articles created by Polbot